Jonathan M. Ansell (born August 13, 1950) is an American entrepreneur and CEO in the insurance and insurtech industry. Ansell is the founder and CEO of insurtech companies Merlinio Technologies and Merlinio Insurance Services, an online digital insurance agency and technology platform serving the millennial market. Before Merlinio, Ansell was a co-founder and CEO of Fusion Company, a global digital merchandising provider that specializes in ancillary products. Fusion was created in 2012 after being spun-out of a large international insurance company. Previously Ansell was the President, CEO and one of the co-founders of what is now Allianz Global Assistance USA, one of the largest travel insurance companies in the US and American specialty insurer Jefferson Insurance Company. He was also a member of the management board of Allianz Global Assistance, formerly Mondial Assistance, an international travel insurance and assistance company based in Paris, France.

Ansell was born and grew up in Binghamton, New York. He graduated with a BA in economics from Colgate University in 1972 and an MBA from the Wharton School of the University of Pennsylvania in 1977.

From 1972 to 1975, he was an executive for the Broome County Medical Society, an affiliate of the American Medical Association. From 1978 to 1985 he was in charge of corporate planning and product development at Empire Blue Cross and Blue Shield, now an Anthem company. In 1986, he was one of the founders of the travel insurer Access America and World Access, later acquired by the international travel insurer Mondial Assistance. In 2004 he co-founded and served as the first president of the US Travel Insurance Association, the trade association of American insurers, brokers and administrators specializing in travel insurance. He has been cited as a "visionary" in the travel insurance industry  and is a frequent business speaker.

References

External links 
http://www.allianzusa.com
http://www.fusion.com
http://www.merlinio.com

Living people
1950 births
Businesspeople in insurance
People from Binghamton, New York
Businesspeople from Richmond, Virginia
Colgate University alumni
Wharton School of the University of Pennsylvania alumni